Just Listen is the debut studio album by South Korean pop and R&B singer Seven, released on March 7, 2003, under YG Entertainment. It produced four singles: "Come Back to Me", "One More Time", "I Just Wanna Be" and "Baby I Like You Like That". Commercially, the album peaked at number four on the monthly MIAK albums chart for March 2003 and sold over 225,000 copies in South Korea by 2005.

Track listing

Commercial performance 
Just Listen entered the Korean Monthly Album Chart at number 22, with "lukewarm" sales of 13,986 copies However, it started to gain popularity and rose to a peak of number 4 in May 2003, which the album held for two consecutive months The album was the 10th best-selling album on the 2003 year-end chart, with total sales of 212,317 copies.

Accolades

Charts

Monthly charts

Year-end charts

References 

2003 debut albums
Seven (Korean singer) albums
YG Entertainment albums